The National Democratic Party  is a political party in Georgia. It was established in 1988 by Giorgi Chanturia as a radical splinter group of the Ilia Chavchavadze Society, although an earlier party with the same name also existed among the Georgian intelligentsia and in the Democratic Republic of Georgia from 1917 to 1924. 

At the 2012 elections, the party won 3,050 votes, 0.14% of the national total. Recently the party joined the Strength is in Unity–United Opposition coalition before the 2018 presidential election. The current leader of the party is Bachuki Kardava.

References

1988 establishments in Georgia (country)
Centre-right parties in Georgia (country)
Christian democratic parties in Asia
Christian democratic parties in Europe
Political parties established in 1988
Political parties in Georgia (country)
Pro-European political parties in Georgia (country)
Pro-independence parties in the Soviet Union